Yange Oshanka Buddhika Mendis (born 22 June 1979) is a Sri Lankan born cricketer. A left-handed batsman, off spin bowler and occasional wicket-keeper, he has played for the Singapore national cricket team since 2002 having previously played first-class and List A cricket for Bloomfield Cricket and Athletic Club in his native Sri Lanka.

Biography
Produced in Sri Lanka in 1979, Buddhika Mendis Started his cricket career playing Bloomfield Cricket and Athletic Club, Which Makes his Outstanding Introduction in Opposition to Nondescripts Cricket Club in January 1999. He played with first-class games to allow those whatsoever, his past arrival in February 20000.

Shortly ahead of the first of the four Listing A games, most of which came from February/March 2000. He's played at the show annually as besides 2007. He performed at the ACC Trophy at Kuala Lumpur in 2004, additionally Participating in the ACC Fast Track Countries Tournament suits Versus Nepal along with Hong-kong. This season that he played with ACC Fast-track Nations Tournament matches from Malaysia and Hongkong. Back in 2006, he played with at the ACC Trophy in Kuala Lumpur, along with also an ACC Premier-league game Versus Nepal.

He played with at the Saudara Cup game from Malaysia for its Very First Time in 2007, also playing at the ACC Twenty20 Cup at Kuwait this season. He represented Singapore at Division 5  of those Entire World Cricket League at Jersey in 2008.

References

1979 births
Living people
Singaporean cricketers
Sri Lankan cricketers
Bloomfield Cricket and Athletic Club cricketers
Singaporean people of Sri Lankan descent